Molly Maureen Mahood (17 June 1919 – 14 February 2017) was a British literary scholar, whose interests ranged from Shakespeare to postcolonial African literature. She taught at St Hugh's College, Oxford (1947–1954), the University of Ibadan in Nigeria (1954–1963), the University of Dar es Salaam in Tanzania (1963–1967), and the University of Kent at Canterbury (1967–1979).

Early life and education
Mahood was born on 17 June 1919 in Wimbledon, London, England. She was educated at Surbiton High School, an all-girls private school in Kingston upon Thames, London. She studied English at King's College, London, and graduated with a first class honours degree in 1941. She and her fellow students were evacuated to Bristol because of the increasing threat of bombs during the Second World War. She continued her studies and completed a Master of Arts (MA) degree with a dissertation on 17th-century comedy.

Academic career
From 1947 to 1954, Mahood was a Fellow of St Hugh's College, Oxford, then an all-female college of the University of Oxford. She then moved to Nigeria where she became professor of English at the University of Ibadan. Moving to Tanzania, she held the Chair of English at the University of Dar es Salaam from 1963 to 1967. She returned to England and was appointed Professor of English Literature at the University of Kent at Canterbury. Having retired in 1979, she was made Professor Emeritus by Kent and she maintained her links with the university into old age.

Mahood taught at four universities in three countries. Notable former students of hers include Robert Mugabe (President of Zimbabwe), Abiola Irele (Nigerian literary scholar), and Wole Soyinka (Nobel prizewinner).

Later life
In retirement, Mahood studied for and completed a degree in biological sciences.

Mahood died on 14 February 2017, aged 97. Her funeral was held on 3 March 2017 at Clayton Wood Natural Burial Ground near Hassocks, Sussex, England.

Honours
In 1972, Mahood was selected to give the Annual Shakespeare Lecture at the British Academy, the United Kingdoms national academy for the humanities and social sciences. In 2009, she was awarded the Rose Mary Crawshay Prize by the British Academy for The Poet as Botanist. In July 2010, she was awarded an honorary Doctor of Letters (DLitt) degree by the University of Kent.

Selected works

References

1919 births
2017 deaths
British literary critics
British women literary critics
Shakespearean scholars
Postcolonial literature
Fellows of St Hugh's College, Oxford
Academic staff of the University of Ibadan
Academic staff of the University of Dar es Salaam
Academics of the University of Kent
Rose Mary Crawshay Prize winners
People from Wimbledon, London
People educated at Surbiton High School
Alumni of King's College London
British expatriates in Nigeria
British expatriates in Tanzania